Grigory Borisovich Adamov (born Abram Borukhovich Gibs; Абрам Борухович Гибс; May 18, 1886, Kherson, then Russian Empire, now Ukraine, - June 14, 1945, Moscow, USSR) was a Soviet science fiction writer, best known for his novels Conquerors of the Underground (1937), The Mystery of the Two Oceans (1939) and The Ousting of the Ruler (1946).

Biography
Abram Gibs was born in Kherson, the seventh child of a poor Jewish timber factory worker. Expelled from a local gymnasium due to his family's inability to pay for the course, he started to earn his living by giving lessons of grammar and arithmetic. His parents wanted him to become a doctor, but at the age of 15 Abram Gibs joined a radical youth circle, then the Kherson Bolshevik party organization.

In 1906 he was arrested and deported to the Arkhangelsk area, however, he soon escaped and made his way to Saint Petersburg, then, as part of a Bolshevik envoy group, travelled to Sevastopol and took part in the operation the end result of which was the destroying of documents of the battleship Potyomkin mutineers' trial. Arrested for agitation among Russian Black Sea Fleet sailors, Gibs was sentenced to three years in jail.

In 1911, using the pen name Grigory Adamov, Gibs started contributing to the Kherson-based Yug (South) newspaper, of which he soon became the editor. After the 1917 Revolution Adamov joined the Narkomprod (where he became friends with future academician Otto Schmidt), then Goslitizdat publishing house, all the while writing for different journals, including Nashi Dostizhenyia (Our Achievements), edited by Mikhail Koltsov. As a correspondent for Za Industrializatsiyu (For Industrialization) newspaper Adamov travelled all over the country. It was during these voyages that he developed strong interest in science and new technology.

Literary career
In 1930 Adamov became a professional writer. His first short stories, belonging to the so-called '' genre and dealing with Solar energy and Earth power employment, artificial climate change, etc., were published by Znanie-Sila (Knowledge is Power) magazine. In 1937 Conquerors of the Underground came out. This finely written novel rich with technical trivia and with a spy thriller element to it became popular with the young, technically minded Soviet readership.

Even more successful was Adamov's second novel, The Mystery of the Two Oceans (1939), a technothriller telling the story of the Soviet wonder-submarine Pioneer, succeeding in its round-the-world mission despite imperialists' agents' attempts at thwarting it. While working upon it, Adamov became an expert in oceanography, having studied hundreds of scientific books and documents. While writing his third novel, The Ousting of the Ruler, he made a journey to the Russian Far North, so as to investigate his own idea of the possibility of warming the Arctic Circle area up (by artificially heating the Gulf Stream) and thus benefitting the Soviet economy. The novel was published posthumously, in 1946.

Grigory Adamov died on June 14, 1945, in Moscow.

Select bibliography
 The United Columns (Соединённые колонны, 1931, essays and short stories collection).
 The Accident (Авария, Avariya, 1935, novelet)
 In the Stratosphere (В стратосфере, V stratosphere, 1938, short story)
 Oasis of the Sun (Оазис Солнца, Oazis Solntsa, 1936, novelet)
 Conquerors of the Underground (Победители недр, 1937, novel)
 The Mystery of the Two Oceans (Тайна двух океанов, Taina dvukh okeanov 1939, novel).
 The Attack of the Magnetic Torpedoes (Атака магнитных торпед, Ataka magnitnykh torped, 1938, novella)
 The Ousting of the Ruler (Изгнание владыки, Izgnaniye vladyki, 1946, novel).

Translations
 Das Geheimnis zweier Ozeane (German). Moscow, Verlag Progreß, 1948, 1962, 1966, 1978, 1980, 1982; Verlag Neues Leben, 1956, 1959.
 Taina celor doua oceane (Romanian). Bucharest. Editura Tineretului, 1957.
 Kahe ookeani saladus (Estonian). Tallinn: Eesti Riiklik Kirjastus, 1957.
 Երկու օվկիանոսների գաղտնիքը (Armenian). Yerevan, Հայպետհրատ, 1964.

Notes

References 

1886 births
1945 deaths
Writers from Kherson
Russian science fiction writers
Soviet science fiction writers
Soviet children's writers
Soviet novelists
Soviet male writers
20th-century Russian male writers
Soviet Jews
Jewish Ukrainian writers
Jewish novelists
20th-century Ukrainian writers
20th-century Russian journalists
20th-century Ukrainian journalists